Vanadyl nitrate, also called vanadium oxytrinitrate or vanadium oxynitrate is an inorganic compound of vanadium in the +5 oxidation state with nitrate ligands and oxygen. The formula is VO(NO3)3.  It is a pale yellow viscous liquid.

Production
It is made by soaking vanadium pentoxide in liquid dinitrogen pentoxide for durations around two days at room temperature. The yield for this method is about 85%.
V2O5 + 3 N2O5 → 2 VO(NO3)3.
Purification can be achieved by vacuum distillation.

Mononitratodioxovanadium (VO2NO3) is an intermediate in this synthesis. It is a brick red solid. 

Vanadyl nitrate can also be made from vanadyl trichloride VOCl3 and dinitrogen pentoxide.

Structure
VO(NO3)3 has a distorted pentagonal bipyramid shape with idealized Cs (mirror) symmetry. The vanadium oxygen bond (157.2 pm) is typical for vanadyl(V). Two nitrate groups in the pentagonal plane are bidentate (V-O distances range from 199 to 206 pm). The third nitrate spans the pentagonal plane (197 pm) to the position trans to oxo (223 pm).

Properties
Vanadyl nitrate dissolves in dichloromethane, nitromethane, carbon tetrachloride, and saturated hydrocarbons.  1-Hexene, or other unsaturated hydrocarbons ignite upon contact with vanadyl nitrate. Upon contact with water, it irreversibly hydrolyzes, releasing nitric acid.

The ultraviolet spectrum of the liquid shows an absorption band peaking at 208 nm with a shoulder at 242 nm. At 55 °C the gaseous vanadyl nitrate has absorption bands also at 486, 582 and 658 nm in the visual light spectrum.  in the infrared region, liquid vanadyl nitrate absorbs at 1880, 1633, 1612, 1560, 1306, 1205, 1016, 996, 965, 895, 783, 632, 457, 357, 301, 283, 234, 193, 133, 93 and 59 cm−1. Gaseous vanadyl nitrate has absorption bands at 775, 783, 786, 962.5, 994.4, 997.5, 1000.5, 1006.2, 1012, 1016.3, 1020, 1198, 1211, 1216.3, 1564, 1612, 1629, 1632, 1635, 1648 and 1888 cm−1. Many of these bands are due to stretching in nitrogen–oxygen bonds, but 1016.3 cm−1 is due to the double vanadium–oxygen bond. 786 is due to out of phase wagging in N-O, and 775 is due to deformation in O-N=O in the mirror plane.

Reactions
It is a nitrating agent for aromatic compounds. Reactions proceed at room temperature.  Often dichloromethane is used as an inert solvent. Nitrotoluene, methyl benzoate and benzoic acid are nitrated by prolonged exposure over a few days. Benzonitrile does not react. 

Vanadyl nitrate form a solid pale yellow adduct with boron trifluoride. An adduct is also formed with acetonitrile.

References

Other reading
Gmelin, Syst No 48, Teil A & Teil B (Lieferung 1 & 2) (1967); Teil A (Lieferung 1) & Teil A (Lieferung 2) (1968);& Erganzungwerk (Band2)(1971) 
M. Schmeisser, "Chemical Abstracts", (1955), 49, 10873
L. Bretherick, Ed, "Hazards in the Chemical Laboratory", Royal Society of Chemistry, London, Engl (1979), pg. 1160

Vanadium(V) compounds
Nitrates
Vanadyl compounds